The Daepo Jusangjeolli Cliff cliff is a spectacular volcanic rock formation at the southern coast of Jeju Island, South Korea. It is similar to the Giant's Causeway in Northern Ireland.

Jusangjeolli Cliff was created when the lava from Hallasan Mountain erupted into the sea of Jungmun. It was designated as Natural Monument No. 443 on January 6, 2005.

See also 
 List of places with columnar jointed volcanics

References 

Landforms of Jeju Province
Landforms of South Korea
Columnar basalts
Cliffs of Asia
Rock formations of Asia